Gaia Center is a museum in Kifisia, a northeastern suburb of Athens, Greece. It is part of the Goulandris Natural History Museum, presenting the way planet Earth has been functioning for millions of years, from its geological evolution to the present, including the interventions of modern people.

External links
Official web site

Museums in Athens
Natural history museums in Greece